The HP-18 is a Richard Schreder-designed metal Racing Class sailplane that was offered as a kit for homebuilding during the 1970s and 1980s.

Design and development
The HP-18 is a flapped (15-meter) sailplane featuring a V-tail and 90-degree flaps for glidepath control. The fuselage is composed of a prefabricated composite forward fuselage and a semi-monocoque aft fuselage, and features steeply reclined seating and a side-stick controller although modifications using a conventional stick have been made.

Major features:
Very low cockpit with reclining seating position
Sidestick (changed to conventional stick by some homebuilders)
Two-piece canopy (changed to single piece forward opening by some homebuilders)
V-tail that folds upwards for easy storage
Wing structure composed of spars with caps pre-machined from solid aluminium plate and aluminium wing skins bonded to closely spaced foam ribs
Fiberglass fuselage pod, wing tip skids and tail fairings
Aluminium tail cone
Winglets added by some homebuilders
Water ballast carried inside the hollow aluminium wing spars
Typical Schreder trailing edge flaps/airbrakes partially interconnected with the ailerons

Variants
As most homebuilts, the HP-18 has been constructed with many variations in detail. Perhaps the most significant version is the Super HP-18 developed by Canadians Ed Hollestelle and Udo Rumpf, which features a modified wing airfoil, winglets, a front-hinged canopy, conventional control stick and higher ballast capacity.

Aircraft on display
EAA Airventure Museum, Oshkosh, Wisconsin
National Soaring Museum, Elmira, New York
US Southwest Soaring Museum, Moriarty, New Mexico

Specifications

References

Schreder Designs webpage
R Johnson, A Flight Test Evaluation of the HP-18W Sailplane, Soaring, July 2003

External links
HP-18 Reference Info Link

1970s United States sailplanes
Glider aircraft
Schreder aircraft
Homebuilt aircraft
V-tail aircraft